Kazimierz Czesław Switala (Rakoniewice, Poland on 21 April 1923 – Warsaw, 6 March 2011) was a Polish communist politician. He was the Minister of Internal Affairs from 1968 to 1971, but was forced to resign as a result of the December 1970 massacre of 44 revolting Polish workers. He was a member of the Central Committee of the Polish United Workers' Party from 1968 to 1971, and the head of the Chancellery of the Sejm of the Polish People's Republic (1972–1986).

References 

Government ministers of Poland
Interior ministers of Poland
1923 births
2011 deaths